Aghbolagh-e Sofla or Agh Bolagh-e Sofla may refer to:
 Aghbolagh-e Sofla, Maragheh, East Azerbaijan Province
 Aghbolagh-e Sofla, Varzaqan, East Azerbaijan Province
 Agh Bolagh-e Sofla, West Azerbaijan